Nadicorp Holdings Sdn Bhd (Nadicorp) has grown to become one of Malaysia's premier private conglomerates.

Transport 
Nadicorp is a private company which was formed in 1998 and expanded to become Malaysia largest bus operators which it runs via its subsidiary Konsortium Transnasional Bhd.

Its operations are divided into two categories, namely express buses' and stage or local buses which are operated under the brandname Cityliner.

References

Privately held companies of Malaysia
1998 establishments in Malaysia
Companies established in 1998